Jowkar (also Romanized as Jowkār; also known as Jowkār-e Mardom Dān) is a village in Susan-e Gharbi Rural District, Susan District, Izeh County, Khuzestan Province, Iran. At the 2006 census, its population was 132, in 23 families.

References 

Populated places in Izeh County